Wang Jiachao (born September 22, 1991) is a Chinese swimmer who is now a Para triathlete. At the 2012 Summer Paralympics he won 1 gold medal and 2 silver medals. He is currently on track to participate in the Tokyo 2020 Paralympics.

References

Paralympic swimmers of China
Swimmers at the 2012 Summer Paralympics
Paralympic gold medalists for China
Paralympic silver medalists for China
Living people
1991 births
Medalists at the 2012 Summer Paralympics
Medalists at the 2008 Summer Paralympics
Swimmers at the 2008 Summer Paralympics
Paralympic bronze medalists for China
S8-classified Paralympic swimmers
Paralympic medalists in swimming
Chinese male medley swimmers
21st-century Chinese people